Blessed Sacrament-St. Gabriel High School was a co-educational, private, Roman Catholic high school in New Rochelle, New York in Westchester County. The school was a result of the merger of Blessed Sacrament and Saint Gabriel's into one co-educational institution. The school was conducted by members of the Sisters of Charity and the Congregation of Christian Brothers together with other religious and lay persons. It was located in Blessed Sacrament Parish.

Blessed Sacrament-St. Gabriel High School permanently closed following the completion of the 2012-2013 school year. In November 2012 there was a list of schools published by the archdiocese that had the potential of being closed, but the archdiocese did not put the school on the list. When the archdiocese announced it would close, students and members of the school community were not expecting the news.

Courses 
The following courses constitute the program of studies at Blessed Sacrament-St. Gabriel High School

Freshmen:

 Religion: Hebrew Scriptures
 English 1
 Language Arts
 Mathematics 1,2
 Physical Education
 History: Global Studies 1
 Foreign Language: Italian 1, Spanish1
 Science: Earth Science, Living Environment
 Computers: Word Processing
 Art

Juniors:

 Religion: Christian Family Life, Christian Service
 English: English 3
 History: United States History
 Foreign Language: Italian3, Spanish3
 Mathematics: Pre-Calculus, Geomoetry, Chemistry, Physics
 Science: Earth Science, Physics
 Computers: Desktop Publishing
 Civil Liberties
 Physical Education

Sophomores:

 Religion: Life of Christ
 English 2
 History: Global Studies 2
 Foreign Language: Italian2, Spanish2
 Mathematics 2, 3
 Science: Earth Science, Living Environment
 Computers: Word Processing, Computer Application
 Elective Choices: Accounting, Psychology, Intro. to Occupations,
 Art
 Physical Education

Seniors:

 Religion: Morality
 English: English 4
 Social Studies: Government, Economics, Model UN
 Mathematics: Pre-Calculus, Geomoetry, Business Math
 Science: Chemistry, Physics
 Computers: Microsoft Office, Web Page Design
 Health
 Elective Choices: Accounting, Psychology, Intro. to Occupations, Business Law, College Art
 Physical Education

Interscholastic Sports
The school offered the following interscholastic sports:

 Baseball  - Varsity
 Basketball - Varsity, Junior Varsity
 Soccer  - Varsity
 Softball - Varsity
 Track and Field
 Volleyball - Junior Varsity
 Bowling

Clubs and activities 

 National Honor Society
 Student Government
 Chess Club
 Art Club
 Academic Team
 French Club
 Biology Club
 Yearbook
 Newspaper
 Music and Drama Society
 Computer Club

Notable alumni
Larry Hennessy 
 Curtis Dennis 
 Jarrid Famous

Notes and references

Defunct Catholic secondary schools in New York (state)
Educational institutions disestablished in 2013
Education in New Rochelle, New York
Schools in Westchester County, New York